Banksia stenoprion is a species of prostrate shrub that is endemic to the south-west of Western Australia. It has short, underground stems, pinnatisect leaves with triangular lobes, golden, mauve or purple flowers in heads of up to ninety, and egg-shaped follicles.

Description
Banksia stenoprion is a prostrate shrub with short, underground, fire-resistant stems. There are between forty and eighty-five narrow triangular to elliptical lobes on each side of the leaves.

Taxonomy and naming
This species was first formally described in 1855 by Swiss botanist Carl Meissner who gave it the name Dryandra stenoprion and published the description in Hooker's Journal of Botany and Kew Garden Miscellany from specimens collected by James Drummond.

In 2007 Austin Mast and Kevin Thiele transferred all dryandras to the genus Banksia and renamed this species Banksia stenoprion.

Distribution and habitat
Banksia stenoprion occurs from Cockleshell Gully near Mount Lesueur to Badgingarra, where it grows in kwongan.

Conservation status
This banksia is classified as "not threatened" by the Western Australian Government Department of Parks and Wildlife.

References

stenoprion
Plants described in 1855
Taxa named by Carl Meissner